Joyrex J5 EP is an EP by Richard D. James under the alias Caustic Window. The release is a 12 inch vinyl.

All tracks, except the untitled second track on side B, were later re-released on the album Compilation.

Track listing

Side A
"Astroblaster" – 5:27
"On The Romance Tip" – 5:04

Side B
"Joyrex J5" – 6:54
"(untitled)" – 3:42
No track titles appear anywhere on the release; track titles come from the later release of Compilation, except for the untitled track on side B, which is often nicknamed "R2D2".

References

Aphex Twin EPs
1992 EPs